Waka/Jawaka (also known as Waka/Jawaka — Hot Rats) is the fourth solo album by Frank Zappa, released in July 1972. The album is the jazz-influenced precursor to The Grand Wazoo (November 1972), and as the front cover indicates, a sequel of sorts to 1969's Hot Rats. According to Zappa, the title "is something that showed up on a ouija board at one time."

Songs
"Big Swifty" is a jazz-fusion tune, similar to many of Zappa's pieces from the jazz period of his compositional timeline. It features many horns to achieve a thick brassy sound as well as room for improvisation and use of multiple time signatures.

The track "It Just Might Be a One-Shot Deal" is a strange tale of hallucinations sung by Sal Marquez and Janet Ferguson (the "tough-minded" groupie in 200 Motels). Sneaky Pete Kleinow's pedal steel guitar sets up a dream-like, smooth quality, but with the words "but you should be diggin' it while it's happening cause it just might be a one-shot deal", though played in real time rather than achieved with a splice, it again sounds as if the music has started to run backwards.

Critical reception 
Initial reviews for the album were mixed. Rolling Stone'''s Rob Houghton compared it to "second-rate Miles Davis," but concluded that Waka/Jawaka was "one of Zappa’s most enjoyable, less hypertense efforts." Village Voice critic Robert Christgau was less charitable: "With Sal Marquez playing 'many trumpets' all over 'Big Swifty,' there are times you could drop the needle and think you were listening to recent Miles Davis. That's certainly what Zappa's been doing. But where Davis is occasionally too loose, Zappa's always too tight—he seems to perceive only what is weird and alienating in his influences, never what is humane. Also, Sal Marquez doesn't play trumpet(s) as good as Miles." However, the album's reputation has improved over time. In UDiscoverMusic in 2022, Jamie Atkins wrote, "Waka/Jawaka stands up on its own as one of Zappa’s most vibrant and enjoyable explorations of jazz-rock."

Reissues
It was reissued in a digitally remastered version on CD by Rykodisc in 1986 (with much digital reverb added and missing the back cover artwork) and in 1995 (restoring the rear cover, but with identical sound). In 2012, Universal Music released a CD containing a remastered version of the original vinyl mix.
On December 16th, 2022, Universal Music released Dolby Atmos & Dolby TrueHD mix of this album along with The Grand Wazoo as part of a 4CD+1Blu-Ray set named Waka/Wazoo'', to celebrate the 50th Anniversary of the albums. The album was also released in black & colored vinyl to celebrate the 50th Anniversary.

Track listing
All songs written, composed and arranged by Frank Zappa.

Personnel

Musicians on the album
 Frank Zappa – guitar (all tracks, including acoustic guitar on track 3), percussion (1), electric bed springs and uncredited vocals (3)
 Sal Marquez – trumpets (all tracks), vocals (2, 3); chimes (1, 4), flugelhorn (4)
 Erroneous (Alex Dmochowski) – electric bass (all tracks), vocals (3), fuzz bass (4)
 Aynsley Dunbar – drums (all tracks), washboard and tambourine (3)
 Tony Duran – slide guitar (1, 2, 3), vocals (3)
 George Duke – ring-modulated & echoplexed electric piano (1), tack piano (2)
 Mike Altschul – baritone saxophone and piccolo (2, 4), bass flute, bass clarinet and tenor sax (4)
 Kris Peterson – vocals (2, 4)
 Joel Peskin – tenor sax (2)
 Jeff Simmons – Hawaiian guitar and vocals (3)
 Sneaky Pete Kleinow – pedal steel guitar solo (3)
 Janet Ferguson – vocals (3)
 Don Preston – piano and Minimoog (4)
 Billy Byers – trombone and baritone horn (4)
 Ken Shroyer – trombone and baritone horn (4)

Production
 Producer: Frank Zappa
 Engineers: Marshall Brevitz, Kerry McNabb
 Mastering: Frank Zappa
 Supervisor: Marshall Brevitz
 Concept: Sal Marquez
 Creative consultant: Sal Marquez
 Design: Cal Schenkel
 Cover Design: Cal Schenkel
 Cover illustration: Marvin Mattelson
 Illustrations: Marvin Mattelson
 Photography: Philip Schartz
 Back cover: Philip Schwartz
 Packaging: Cal Schenkel
 Repackaging: Ferenc Dobronyi

Charts

References

External links 
 Release details

1972 albums
Albums produced by Frank Zappa
Frank Zappa albums
Jazz fusion albums by American artists
Reprise Records albums